is a Japanese model, actress and beauty pageant titleholder who won Miss Universe Japan 2018 and represented Japan at Miss Universe 2018.

Personal life
Kato was born in Nagoya Japan and later raised by her parents in Selangor, Malaysia from 5 to 13 years old. From the age of 15–18, she went to Matsuo-Ryu (tea ceremony organization) in Japan to study Japanese traditional culture and tea servings. Then at the age of 19, she started her modelling career on her own and is currently attached to Central Japan Model Agency. She is fluent in Japanese, Malay, and English language. Kato works as a model, actress and reporter.

Miss Universe Japan 2018
On 19 March 2018 Kato was crowned as Miss Universe Japan 2018, represented Mie at Hotel Chinzanso Tokyo. She represented her country Japan at the Miss Universe 2018 held in Bangkok, Thailand on December 17, 2018. She succeeded outgoing Miss Universe Japan 2017 Momoko Abe

Miss Universe 2018
Kato represented her country at the Miss Universe 2018 but she did not make the Top 20.

References

External links
missuniversejapan.jp
missuniverse.com
Yuumi Kato

Living people
Miss Universe 2018 contestants
Japanese beauty pageant winners
Japanese female models
1998 births
People from Nagoya